Rossiya (literally: Russia) is a Russian Arktika-class nuclear-powered icebreaker. In 1990, it became the first ship to carry commercial passenger traffic to the geographic North Pole. Its sister ship Arktika was the first surface ship to reach the pole.

During the winter of 2012–2013, Rossiya was stationed in the Gulf of Finland.

According to Bellona, Rossiya was taken out of service in 2013 and is currently in "cold lay-up" awaiting disposal.

References 

Nuclear-powered icebreakers
Icebreakers of Russia
1985 ships
Ships built at the Baltic Shipyard